Aeroflot Flight 3932 was a flight operated by Aeroflot from Koltsovo Airport to Omsk Tsentralny Airport. On 30 September 1973, the Tupolev Tu-104 operating the route crashed shortly after takeoff from Sverdlovsk, killing all 108 passengers and crew on board.

Aircraft 
The aircraft involved in the accident was a Tupolev Tu-104B with two Mikulin AM-3M-500 engines, registered СССР-42506, originally to the Uzbekistan division of the state airline, Aeroflot.  At the time of the accident, the aircraft sustained had 20,582 flight hours and 9412 pressurization cycles.  The aircraft had 100 passenger seats, hence it was at full capacity when it crashed.

Crew 
Eight crew members were aboard Flight 3932.  The cockpit crew consisted of:
 Captain Boris Stepanovich Putintsev
 Copilot Vladimir Andreevich Shirokov
 Navigator Pyotr Gavrilivich Kanin
 Flight engineer Ivan Yakovlevich Raponov

Synopsis 
Weather conditions at Sverdlovsk were reported to be mild; visibility was over 6 kilometers, and light northwest winds.

Flight 3932 was on the Sverdlovsk-Knevichi route with stopovers at Omsk, Tolmachevo, Kadala, and Khabarovsk airports.  The flight crashed shortly after takeoff on the Koltsovo-Omsk part of the route.

The flight took off from Koltsovo Airport at 18:33 Moscow time and at 18:34:21 headed on a bearing of 256° for the route to Omsk.  As a routine procedure, air traffic control instructed the crew to make a left turn and climb to an altitude of  after takeoff; the crew responded that they would report when they reached the altitude.

Cause 
The aircraft crashed due to incorrect indications by the main artificial horizon and the compass system, caused by a failure of the electrical supply, resulting in spatial disorientation of the pilots. The aircraft crashed approximately five miles from Koltsovo Airport.

See also 

 Aeroflot Flight 964, also a Tupolev Tu-104, which crashed just two weeks after Flight 3932 experiencing similar electrical failures.
 Aeroflot Flight 1912, another Tupolev Tu-104, crashed after a hard landing caused by similar mechanical failures.
 Aeroflot Flight 2415, another Tupolev Tu-104, crashed after takeoff experiencing similar equipment failure.

References 

Accidents and incidents involving the Tupolev Tu-104
Aviation accidents and incidents in the Soviet Union
Airliner accidents and incidents caused by electrical failure
Aviation accidents and incidents in 1973
1973 in the Soviet Union
3932
September 1973 events in Europe